Juan Curet (2 March 1928 – 9 January 2013) was a Puerto Rican boxer. He competed in the men's light welterweight event at the 1952 Summer Olympics.

References

1928 births
2013 deaths
Puerto Rican male boxers
Olympic boxers of Puerto Rico
Boxers at the 1952 Summer Olympics
People from Santurce, Puerto Rico
Light-welterweight boxers